Dibyasingha Deba, known by the symbolic regnal title as Gajapati Maharaja Divyasingha Deva IV  is the current titular Gajapati Maharaja and the King of Puri. He is the current head of the house of Bhoi dynasty, who were the hereditary rulers of the ancient realm of Trikalinga (regions of Kalinga, Utkal, Dakshin Koshala), medieval era Khurda Kingdom and the rulers of the Puri Estate, with their current capital located at Puri.
The Gajapati Maharaja is the current Adhyasevaka (known as the first and foremost servitor) of Lord Jagannatha and according to customs also considered to be the living reflection of the Lord. He is also the chairman of the Shri Jagannatha Temple Managing Committee of the Jagannath Temple at Puri.

Early life
Dibyasingha Deba ascended the throne in 1970 at the age of 17 after the death of his father, the then Maharaja of Puri, Gajapati Birakishore Deba. Before taking the titular name of Dibyasingha Deba, he was named Jenamani Kamarnaba Deba.
He did his schooling from Convent School, Puri and Rajkumar College, Raipur in Chhattisgarh. He went on to pursue his graduation in History from the St. Stephens College from where he graduated in 1972 and then pursued LLB from Law Faculty at University of Delhi (1971-1975). He then pursued LLM from the North Western University of Law (1975-1976), Chicago before eventually taking on the traditional role of the titular King of Puri and hence the chairman of the Temple committee.

Regnal year (Anka year)
The Regnal year (known as Anka year) of the Maharaja used for the corresponding Odia year in the Odia calendar (panjis):

Temple administration and roles
As the titular head of the dynasty, the Gajapati Maharaja acts as the Chairman of the Shri Jagannath Temple Managing Committee and also attends to the rites and rituals of the temple during the festivals and religious occasions like Ratha Jatra, Bahuda Jatra, Pusyabhiseka, Snana Jatra and many other important socio-religious and cultural events. He also leads a team of scholars under the aegis of the Temple Administration named Shri Jagannatha Tatwa, Gabeshana O Prasara Upasamiti.

References

External links
 Jagannath Temple Management

1953 births
Living people
People from Puri
St. Stephen's College, Delhi alumni
Faculty of Law, University of Delhi alumni
Northwestern University Pritzker School of Law alumni
Indian royalty